Grace Episcopal Church is a historic Episcopal church in Mount Meigs, Alabama.  The Carpenter Gothic structure was built in 1892.  The building was placed on the Alabama Register of Landmarks and Heritage on January 29, 1980, and the National Register of Historic Places on February 19, 1982.

See also
National Register of Historic Places listings in Montgomery County, Alabama
Properties on the Alabama Register of Landmarks and Heritage in Montgomery County, Alabama

References

External links

Grace Episcopal Church (official website)

National Register of Historic Places in Montgomery County, Alabama
Churches completed in 1892
19th-century Episcopal church buildings
Properties on the Alabama Register of Landmarks and Heritage
Churches on the National Register of Historic Places in Alabama
Episcopal church buildings in Alabama
Carpenter Gothic church buildings in Alabama